Pinaymootang First Nation (also spelt in Ojibwe as Binemoodaang, meaning Partridge Crop Place) is a First Nations people whose home location is on Fairford 50 Reserve at Fairford, Manitoba, Canada. They are situated on Provincial Trunk Highway 6 (PTH 6) in the Interlake Region of Manitoba about 220 kilometres from Winnipeg. The Rural Municipality of Grahamdale forms most of the reserve's land boundary, although it also has a short border with the Little Saskatchewan First Nation as well as significant lakeshore on Lake St. Martin, which is considered as being outside the reserve.

The geographically separate second part of the Fairford 50 reserve is located on Dunsekikan Island in Lake St. Martin, and is about ten miles east of the main section of the reserve.

The registered population on Fairford 50 is about 1300 people while an additional 1600 live in various other locations. The 2011 Census showed an official population of 989 persons living at Fairford 50.

References 

 Pinaymootang First Nation
 Inac statistics

External links
 Map of Fairford 50 (part in Census Division No. 18) at Statcan
 Map of Fairford 50 (part in Census Division No. 19) at Statcan (Dunsekikan Island)

Interlake Reserves Tribal Council
First Nations governments in Manitoba